The Longest Whale Song is a children's book by Jacqueline Wilson. It is the successor to Little Darlings, also published in 2010 and the predecessor to Lily Alone, first published in 2011.

The story is about a young girl called Ella, whose mum is pregnant with a baby boy and is in hospital after Ella's mum falls into a coma. Ella must face tough times and has to try to carry on a normal life. In school Ella learns about whales. Ella is fascinated about these mysterious creatures. She falls out with her friends and nothing seems right to Ella but with support from her new kind teacher, she works it out. Her mum's husband Jack looks after her and the newborn baby Samson, Ella does not like Jack at first but the character relationships grow and they end up caring for each other.

Characters
Mum – She gives birth to Samson but then something goes wrong and she is put into a coma. Ella makes her listen to whale songs that she enjoys very much. She speaks at the end, complaining about the music. The doctors all believe that her hope is running out, however, when Ella plays her the gentle, calming whale song she sighs ever so softly, as if about to awaken. It forms a very special connection, and for a few moments they can almost communicate. She is a very caring and nurturing mother, and is ever so sensitive to Ella's emotions. She is summarised as the best mother in the world, by her beloved daughter Ella.

Jack – Mum's husband, Ella's stepfather and Samson's dad. Worried out of his mind and is caring for the two children very well, to his surprise. At the beginning Ella described him as "overly-emotional", "daft" and "un-graceful", however, he cares about Ella with all of his heart, and wants nothing more than to receive her delicate trust. During such a trying time, sometimes his soft emotions lead him to say hurtful things to Ella, but he always apologises after and makes sure she is alright.

Samson – Ella's half-brother. Ella and Jack look after him for Mum. Ella doesn't want to love or care for him, because if he wasn't born her mother would still have the ability to walk and communicate, however, when she feeds him with his bottle and they look into each other's eyes, his little hands trying to stroke her and his eyes soft with tenderness, she begins to cry as she realises she is beginning to love him almost as much as Mum.

Sally – A girl who appears to be Ella's friend but isn't there for her when she needs it most. At the beginning of the emotional experience she shows kindness to her friend, but as time passes by she grows sick of Ella's constant unhappy emotions and decides she would rather not be Ella's friend. Ella grows extremely sad, but she then finds a new special friend.

Martha – Originally Dory's best friend, Martha offends Ella at after-school club by calling her Mum a vegetable. After Ella and her get into a fight, they reconcile and she ends up being Ella's friend. Poor Martha's family does some very violent things towards her, and once Ella sees this it upsets her deeply. When she confides in Jack, he advises her to make friends. Once Martha's beautiful true colors begin to shine through, it's as if there is a sweet, lovely rainbow in the sky for the two girls.

Dory – Originally Martha's best friend, when Ella is off school checking on her Mum. Dory and Martha become friends with Sally. Dory does not like Martha very much but is scared to say because Martha is quite rude. Dory is slightly like the beloved character Dory from Finding Nemo, because of her sunny nature and friendliness. However, she agrees with Sally's negative comments about Ella meaning she's quite mean, therefore Ella doesn't like her very much.

Butterscotch – Ella's guinea pig. Her real dad buys him for her when he comes to take her out. Butterscotch is described as very sweet and delicate, and he seems equally effected by the scenario. Mother would truly love him, and Ella wishes that she could bring him to the hospital to show him to  her special mother.

Mike – Ella's father who takes her out once during the time Mum is in a coma but he doesn't truly care about her. Him and Jack really despise each other. While he shows care for Ella, his job and wealth appears to be his priority, and he'd rather buy Ella elegant outfits than give her a cuddle and tell her he loves her.

Joseph – A boy from Ella's class who is really supportive during Mum's illness. He includes Ella when Sally turns her back on her and invites her to his house so that she doesn't have to see Martha at after-school club. Jack teases Ella, calling Joseph her boyfriend, but he is also delighted that she has found such a special friend during this emotional time. Ella never really noticed Joseph, until one day he began to cry mid class when Ella got emotional and had a small breakdown. He is a very sensitive and shy boy, and the truest friend anyone could ever ask for. They love each other and care about each other deeply, and Ella expresses feelings of compassion and affection towards her beloved friend.

Liz – A friend of Ella's mum who is hopeless around kids. She is quite squeamish as when Jack offers her to visit Ella's mum she refused as she told Jack she couldn't bear to see her like that. However, she does visit Jack and Ella to deliver food for them. Liz is very sad about the situation, but her anxiety has led her to stay away from Sue (Ella's lovely mother). She visits her once, but has a little breakdown and while she apologises, Ella no longer has respect for her.

References

External links
 BBC review

Novels by Jacqueline Wilson
2010 British novels
Novels about animals
Doubleday (publisher) books